Agricultural spray adjuvants are part of integrated pest management, and during pesticide application are used to enhance the effectiveness of pesticides, herbicides, insecticides, fungicides and other agents that control or eliminate unwanted pests. As with medical adjuvants, agricultural spray adjuvants are not themselves active in controlling or killing pests. Instead, these additives modify some property of the spray solution, which improves the ability of the pesticide to penetrate, target or protect the target organism. Among the typical types of ingredients used are surfactants, emulsifiers, oils and salts. Each of these ingredients, and others, modifies the spray solution itself to improve such properties as spreading, penetration, droplet size or other characteristics.

These additives may be included in a formulation with a pesticide or may be added separately to a tank. When they are included in the pesticide formulations themselves, they are called in-can adjuvants. Agricultural spray adjuvants may also be added separately when the spray solution is being prepared. In this case, the adjuvant is called a tank mix adjuvant. When delivered in-can, adjuvants may be quite effective. However, because of the limited space or limited compatibility in a pesticide formulation, not all necessary adjuvants may be included in-can. Thus, the addition of tank mix adjuvants may be necessary to optimize performance of the pesticide.

Agricultural spray adjuvants do not reduce the amount of pesticide needed below the recommended use rate on a pesticide label. In fact, it is illegal to use a pesticide in the US outside of the instructions on the label, although FIFRA, the US law governing pesticide use, does allow for the use of pesticides at rates below the label, as long as the label does not specifically deny such use. Agricultural spray adjuvants are used to enhance the performance of the legal amount of a pesticide that may be used. These adjuvants give more consistent performance and may make up for under-performance under certain conditions.

Adjuvant Related Regulations 

In the United States, agricultural tank adjuvants are essentially unregulated except in a few isolated cases. The states of Washington and California require that adjuvants be registered before they can be sold. Other states may or may not regulate adjuvants at some level. There is no federal regulation of tank mix adjuvants.

However, the industry itself has several efforts underway in order to self regulate the products. The ASTM International (ASTM) E35.22 committee is the committee that defines agricultural tank mix claims for the industry. The standard E1519 defines the various claims that an adjuvant may make and reference the methods by which the claim may be proven. The methods are tests, which when applied to a given sample, prove that the material meets the claimed standard.

Supporting the activities of ASTM is the Council of Producers & Distributors of Agrotechnology (CPDA), an organization of inert (or other) ingredient and adjuvant manufacturers. CPDA certifies adjuvants by creating certain minimum standards that must be met in order to receive the CPDA stamp of certification.

In Canada, adjuvants are regulated by the Pest Management Regulatory Agency (PMRA) section of Health Canada. Each adjuvant must be tested and be proven to be safe and effective with every active ingredient with which it will be used. This much more stringent requirement prevents both the widespread use and questionable content present in the United States.

In the UK, the Chemical Regulations Directorate (CRD), part of the Health and Safety Executive, oversees the use of adjuvants. CRD defines an adjuvant as a substance other than water which is not in itself a pesticide but which enhances or is intended to enhance the effectiveness of the pesticide with which it is used. Adjuvants for use with agricultural pesticides have been categorised as extenders, wetting agents, sticking agents and fogging agents.

The Council of Producers & Distributors of Agrotechnology offers participating companies the ability to self-certify their spray adjuvant products in the USA.

References

External links
The Chemical Regulations Directorate
Mandops - Manufacturers of Agricultural/Horticultural adjuvants
ASTM E35 Subcommittee
Chemical Producers and Distributors Association
Health and Safety Executive

Pest control techniques